FC Chornomorets Odesa is a Ukrainian professional football club based in Odesa.

The club's home ground is the 34,164 capacity Chornomorets Stadium opened in 1935 and rebuilt in 2011. According to the club's website, it was formed in 1936 as Dynamo, but until 2002 it carried a logo with 1958 and 1959 years of foundation on its shield when the club received its current name. Moreover, the club's shield is very similar to the shield of Romanian FC Farul Constanța.

For over 30 years, the club was sponsored by the Black Sea Shipping Company (1959–1991). The club was among top 20 Soviet clubs that competed in Soviet Top League.

History

Black Sea (pre-history)
At the beginning of the 20th century, in Odesa, within limits of Alexander Park (today Shevchenko Park), a construction started of what was supposed to become a pond. However, after the pit for the pond was dug out, the funding stopped and so did the construction. Soon the hole began to serve as a field for one of city's non-league teams. As the hole resembled a shape of the Black Sea, that was the nickname given to the field, and the team was named "" Chorne more. And although that team is unrelated to the today's club, it was the first team in Odesa to play under that name.

History of name

Dynamo and previous names

The official date of foundation of Chernomorets Odesa is considered to be 26 March 1936 as Dynamo Odesa. Dynamo Odesa, however, participated before that in the city championship since 1923 (the year of establishment of the Ukrainian football competitions) winning it in 1933. Dynamo Odesa itself was first called Spartak Odesa until 1926. In 1940, after relegating from the Top level, the club was merged with Kharchovyk Odesa that participated in the republican competitions (Championship of Ukrainian SSR) and replaced Dynamo in next competitions. In 1941, the club was reformed again when it was included into the War Championship (Top division) under the name of Spartak Odesa.

Concurrently in league competitions of the Ukrainian SSR, since 1936 in Odesa played another team Kharchovyk Odesa.

Until Chornomorets Odesa was bought out by Leonid Klimov sometime in 2001, the club's foundation was considered to be 1958.

Post WWII and Kharchovyk/Pischevik
After World War II the club was reestablished as Kharchovyk Odesa in the lower Soviet division (Class B). In 1950, the club lost its place in the play-offs to Spartak Uzhhorod (Zakarpattia Uzhhorod) and was dissolved. In 1953, upon the enlargement of the "Class B" competitions (Second division), the city of Odesa was represented by Metalurh (in Class B 1953, 1954) which soon was replaced again with already more familiar Kharchovyk Odesa. In 1957–58, there was established Avanhard sports society which adopted number of other smaller societies in Ukraine under its umbrella. In 1958, the Odesa city team adopted the name Chornomorets and represented the city's Rope Factory.

Chornomorets (Black Sea Shipping Company)
In 1959, Chornomorets was handed over to the Black Sea Shipping Company which was a member of Vodnik sports society. Since then its emblem corresponded with the main emblem of Vodnik society.

In the last season of the Soviet Top League, Chornomorets earned fourth place, the only time it ever placed above the big clubs in Ukraine, Dynamo Kyiv, Shakhtar Donetsk and Dnipro Dnipropetrovsk.

Recent history
The club was a founding member of the Ukrainian Premier League, winning the Ukrainian Cup and finishing 5th in the inaugural 1992 season. Chornomorets finished 3rd the next two seasons and 2nd during the following two seasons. They also won another domestic Cup in 1994. The club's most successful spell was achieved under the guidance of Viktor Prokopenko, and later under Leonid Buryak. At the end of the 1997–98 season, following big financial troubles and the sale of a number of leading players, the club was relegated to the First League.

They won promotion the following 1998–99 season, but finished in the second last place next year and were relegated again. Sometimes in 2001, the Klimov's Primorie company which owned SC Odesa along with Imexbank acquired the city's main team. In 2002 SC Odesa was merged with Chornomorets. Chornomorets came back up again for the 2002–03 season and enjoyed several decent seasons in the Premier League. They finished third in the 2005–06 season and took part in the 2006–07 UEFA Cup tournament.

Chornomorets were deducted 6 points by FIFA on 6 November 2008. It was confirmed by Ukrainian Premier League on 2 March 2009. The club managed to finish the 2008–09 season in 10th place despite the deduction. The 2009–10 season started badly with a 5–0 loss to Dynamo Kyiv and a poor run of form that saw the team finish the first half of the season in 13th place, just two spots away from the relegation zone. The club was relegated to the First League at the end of the season. It took, however, just a year for Chornomorets to return to the Ukrainian top flight for the 2011–12 season.

Following a loss in relegation playoffs on 27 May 2018 Chornomorets fans attacked the head coach of the club.

Stadium and infrastructure

The main stadium of club is traditionally considered Chornomorets Stadium that until 2012 was called as the Central Stadium of the Black Sea Shipping Company. The stadium is located in the Shevchenko Park.

Among other stadiums Chornomorets also used Stadion "Dnister" imeni V.Dukova (2004–2005, reserves) in Ovidiopol at the Dnister Liman, Spartak Stadium (2005–2006, reserves) in Odesa, Chornomorets Training Base in Sovinyon (2006–2007, reserves) in Odesa.

Kits and shirts Sponsors

European competitions
Chornomorets Odesa participates in European competitions since 1975 after playing its first game against S.S. Lazio in the UEFA Cup 1975/76.

Honours

Domestic achievements
 Ukrainian Premier League
 Runners-up (2): 1994–95, 1995–96
 Third place (3): 1992–93, 1993–94, 2005–06
 Ukrainian First League
 Runners-up (3): 1998–99, 2001–02, 2010–11
 Ukrainian Cup
 Winners (2): 1992, 1993–94
 Runners-up (1): 2012–13
 Ukrainian Super Cup
 Runners-up (1): 2013
 Soviet Top League
 Third place (1): 1974
 Soviet First League 
 Winners (3): 1961, 1973, 1987
 Runners-up (1): 1962
 Soviet League Cup
 Winners (1): 1990

International achievements
 UEFA Intertoto Cup
 Runners-up (1): 2007

Naming history

Officially in the Soviet Union Ukrainian teams carried both names in Russian and Ukrainian.
1926: Club formed FC Dynamo Odessa (out of Sparta Odessa)
1936: Dynamo was admitted to the All-Union competitions
1936: KinAp Odessa entered league competitions at republican level (Ukraine)
1938: Pischevik / Kharchovyk Odessa entered league competitions at republican level (Ukraine)
1940: Dynamo football team dissolved, its players joined Kharchovyk which admitted to the All-Union competitions
1941: Club renamed Spartak Odessa
1942: World War II (club was dissolved)
1944: Club revived as Dynamo Odessa which qualified for final stage of the Cup of the Ukrainian SSR
1945: Club reformed as Kharchovyk Odessa admitted to the All-Union competitions
1950: Kharchovyk relegated and dissolved
1951: Metallurg / Metalurh Odessa (team of Kim Fomin) promoted to the All-Union competitions
1955: Club split reviving Kharchovyk Odessa in the All-Union competitions (in place of Metalurh, while Metalurh continued to play at republican level)
1958: Club renamed Chernomorets / Chornomorets Odessa as part of the Odessa Rope Factory
1959: Chornomorets Odessa became a part of the Black Sea Shipping Company
1999: Former Soviet army sports club SC Odesa merged into Chornomorets

Players

Current squad

Out on loan

Former players

  Eduard Stoyanov
  Oleksandr Zabara

Coaches and administration

League and Cup history

The scheme below shows performance of a team which carried names Kharchovyk (Pischevik) and Chornomorets (Chernomorets) only.

Soviet Union

Ukraine

Managers

First team

 Konstantin Shchegotsky (1945–46)
 Aleksei Kostylev (1953)
 Vsevolod Bobrov (1963)
 Vladimir Gorokhov (1964)
 Yuriy Voynov (1964–67)
 Valentin Fyodorov (1967)
 Nikolai Morozov (1967–68)
 Sergei Shaposhnikov (1968–70)
 Yuriy Voynov (1970)
 Viktor Zhylin (1971)
 Nikolai Morozov (1971)
 Ahmad Alaskarov (1973–77)
 Nikita Simonyan (1980–81)
 Viktor Prokopenko (1982–86)
 Anatoli Polosin (1987–88)
 Viktor Prokopenko (1989–94)
 Leonid Buryak (1994–98)
 Oleksandr Holokolosov (1998–99)
 Anatoliy Azarenkov (1999–01)
 Oleksandr Skrypnyk (2001–02)
 Valeriy Porkujan (2002–??)
 Semen Altman (1 January 2003 – 23 June 2007)
 Vitaly Shevchenko (27 June 2007 – 3 November 2008)
 Viktor Hryshko (3 November 2008 – 12 August 2009)
 Ihor Nakonechnyi (interim) (12 August 2009 – 1 September 2009)
 Andriy Bal (1 September 2009 – 13 May 2010)
 Ihor Nakonechnyi (13 May 2010 – 16 November 2010)
 Roman Hryhorchuk (16 November 2010 – 2014)
 Oleksandr Babych (2014 – 22 August 2017)
 Oleksandr Hranovskyi (interim) (22 August 2017 – 30 August 2017)
 Oleksiy Chystyakov (interim) (30 August 2017 – 4 September 2017)
 Oleg Dulub (4 September 2017 – 22 December 2017)
 Kostyantyn Frolov (23 December 2017 – 13 June 2018)
 Angel Chervenkov (13 June 2018 – 16 September 2019)
 Vitaliy Starovik (interim) (16 September 2019 – 14 October 2019)
 Ostap Markevych (14 October 2019 – April 2020)
 Serhiy Kovalets (13 May 2020 – 18 February 2021)
 Oleksiy Antonov (18 February 2021 – 22 June 2021)
 Yuriy Moroz (23 June 2021 – 30 December 2021)
 Roman Hryhorchuk (30 December 2021 – present)

Reserve team
 Oleksandr Skrypnyk (2004 – 2005)
 Vladyslav Zubkov (2005)

Presidents
 1989–1992 Yuriy Zabolotnyi
 1992–1995 Vyacheslav Leshchuk
 1996–1997 Hryhoriy Biberhal
 1998–1998 Petro Naida
 1998–2002 Leonid Klimov (honorary president ever since)
 2002–present Oleh Marus (acting)

See also
FC Chornomorets-2 Odesa
SK Odesa
Black Sea Shipping Company

Notes

References

External links
Official website
Fan's website (archived 28 August 2008)

 
Ukrainian Premier League clubs
Black Sea Shipping Company
Association football clubs established in 1936
1936 establishments in Ukraine
Soviet Top League clubs
Football clubs in Odesa
Football clubs in the Ukrainian Soviet Socialist Republic
Pishchevik Voluntary Sports Society